Opinion polls for the 2023 Turkish general election are organized by the specific office or leadership approvals.

 Opinion polling for the 2023 Turkish presidential election
 Opinion polling for the 2023 Turkish parliamentary election
 Leadership approval polling for the 2023 Turkish general election